Roger Michael Humphrey Binny (born 19 July 1955) is an Indian former international cricketer who is the 36th and incumbent president of Board of Control for Cricket in India. He was the president of Karnataka State Cricket Association from 2019 to 2022. Binny won the 1983 Cricket World Cup and the 1985 World Championship of Cricket, being India's highest wicket taker in both tournaments. He was also the head coach of the Indian U-19 team that won the 2000 Under-19 Cricket World Cup and has served as a national selector. He has also worked as a developmental officer in the Asian Cricket Council (ACC).

Family and background

Binny is the first Anglo-Indian of Scottish origin who played cricket for team India. His son, Stuart Binny, followed his footsteps, having played state cricket for Karnataka cricket team, and international cricket for the India national cricket team.

Playing career 
Roger Binny is best known for his impressive bowling performance in the 1983 Cricket World Cup, in which he was the highest wicket-taker (18 wickets), and in the 1985 World Series Cricket Championship in Australia where he repeated this feat (17 wickets).

Binny made his test cricket debut at the M. Chinnaswamy Stadium in Bangalore against Pakistan, in the first test of 1979 series. Against the bowling line-up of Imran Khan and Sarfraz Nawaz, Binny proved to be a versatile allrounder, scoring 46 runs in a drawn match. Binny would turn into a useful test match bowler, taking India to victory with his seven wickets in a match against England at Headingley in 1986, and with a spell of 4 for 9 in 30 balls, as a part of his best Test figures of 6 for 56, against Pakistan in Calcutta in 1987. His Test career was not stellar, but he and fellow Pace bowler Karsan Ghavri were helpful in getting the shine off the new ball before India's spinner could take over.

Binny, Ghavri (along with wicket-keeper Syed Kirmani) and Madan Lal were also credited with saving many test matches with his aggressive rear-guard actions, helping avert innings defeats. Binny would rescue India with an unbeaten 83 in a record seventh-wicket partnership of 155 with Madan Lal against Pakistan in Bangalore in 1983. Tall and athletically built, Binny was also an excellent fielder.

Binny was generally in and out of the Indian team but proved his value in the English conditions of the 1983 Cricket World Cup, where along with Madan Lal, and under the leadership of Kapil Dev, he helped India to its first World Cup title with a record 18 wickets.

Coaching career and media 
Binny coached the Indian U-19 team to victory at the 2000 Under-19 Cricket World Cup held in Sri Lanka in January 2000. Mohammed Kaif and Yuvraj Singh from this team would go on to have distinguished careers with the senior cricket team. He was coach of the Bengal cricket team in 2007, however they would win only won one game and finish bottom of Group B in the Ranji Trophy Super League. He worked as a pundit for NewsX, during the 2011 Cricket World Cup.

Administration 

Binny served in the management of the Karnataka State Cricket Association management until he was appointed national selector in September 2012. Binny would recuse himself from selection matters involving his son Stuart Binny but nonetheless resigned from his position in 2015 during the Lodha Committee inquiry because of "perception than propriety" according to Sunil Gavaskar.

He was elected unopposed as the president of BCCI on 18 October 2022, succeeding Saurav Ganguly.

International awards

One Day International Cricket

Man of the Match awards

In popular culture
Bollywood Director Kabir Khan has made a sports drama film named 83 about India's first world cup win in 1983 at Lord's, in which, Nishant Dahiya plays the role of Roger Binny.

See also 
 Sport in India - Sporting culture overview of India 
 1983 Cricket World Cup Final

Bibliography 
 Sundaresan, P.N. "India's Internationals Keen to be Tested", ABC Cricket Book: New Zealand, India in Australia 1980-81, ed. McGilvray, A., Australian Broadcasting Commission: Sydney. .

References

1955 births
Living people
Anglo-Indian people
India One Day International cricketers
Binny Roger
Indian cricketers
Karnataka cricketers
Goa cricketers
South Zone cricketers
Cricketers at the 1983 Cricket World Cup
Cricketers at the 1987 Cricket World Cup
Cricketers from Bangalore
Indian cricket coaches
Indian cricket administrators